Jamais Te Esquecerei (en:"I will never forget you") is a Brazilian telenovela shown by the SBT between April 14 and September 26 of 2003, at 10h30. Based on the original text of Caridad Bravo Adams, it was translated by Henrique Zambelli and adapted by Ecila Pedroso, that also the supervision of text signed, and Enéas Carlos. The soap opera was directed by Jacques Lagôa, Sacha and Henrique Martins, with David Grimberg as managing generality of teledramaturgia. It had 120 chapters.

Plot
In Mountain range of the Rocks, a small agricultural city, the adolescents Beatriz (Lorenza Chiamurela) and Danilo (Vitor Morosini) make an oath of perpetual love. However, they do not imagine that immense difficulties created for the destination and obstacles that will have to face would come to materialize the biggest desire of its lives.

Leonor (Bia Seidl), a bitter woman who is mother of Danilo, is the obstacle most terrible. It is who will go to use the most terrible resources to hinder that its son they love Beatriz, therefore it knows that its husband, Antônio (Jonas Bloch), not yet forgets the mother Beatriz and its old passion, Isabela (Tássia Camargo). When young, Antônio and Isabela had been hindered of if marrying for the father of the young woman, compelled who it if to marry another man.

Fifteen years later, Antônio and Isabela if they find, at a moment where it is gives to die. There it promises to take care of the son of it, Beatriz, as if the girl was its proper son. This is the last desire of the young woman. But when perceiving the strong linking between Beatriz and Danilo, the wife of it sees to grow an unhealthy jealousy in its heart and, each more Machiavellian day, separates the couple. Thus, the control of the villainous, Beatriz is registered a convent and Danilo goes to study in the United States.

But Leonor not yet foresees that the time and in the distance goes to become the love enters the intense couple still more. Therefore, already adult, it starts to be the protagonist of a still more perverse tram: been deceptive, Beatriz (Ana Paula Tabalipa) and Danilo (Fábio Azevedo) will believe that they are blood brothers.

The couple will try to run away from the intense passion that one feels for the other, without forgetting the promise and them words that will bring the true happiness for it.

Cast

Main actors
Ana Paula Tabalipa - Beatriz
Fábio Azevedo - Danilo
Bia Seidl - Leonor
Danton Mello - Eduardo Moraima
Marcos Wainberg - Vítor
Vera Zimmermann - Açucena
Felipe Folgosi - Álvaro
Viviane Victorette - Letícia
Wanderley Cardoso - Adamastor
Micaela Góes - Sílvia
Clarisse Abujamra - Alzira
Delano Avelar - noivo de Leonor
Rogério Márcico - Samuel
Magali Biff - Iracema
Glauce Graieb - Superior Madre
Chica Lopes - Sister Daisy
Ana Maria Nascimento e Silva - Irene
Aldine Müller - Délia
Rejane Arruda - Branca

Special participation
Jonas Bloch - Antônio
Tássia Camargo - Isabela

Also
César Pezzuoli - Justo
Carine Quadros - Hilda
Sandra Mara - Madalena
Jonathan Nogueira - Beto
Amadeu Lamounier - Léo

Soundtrack
The soundtrack was released in 2003 by label SBT Music with Sony.

Jamais Te Esquecerei - Ivan Lins
Quase um Segundo - Luiza Possi
Que Amor É Esse - Chitãozinho & Xororó
Doce Presença - Luanda Cozetti
Um Dia a Mais - Zezé Di Camargo & Luciano
Resposta ao Tempo - Adriana Godoy
Tempestade de Paixão - Guilherme & Santiago
Todos os Meus Sentidos - Olivia Heringer
Poeira no Vento - Chrystian & Ralf
Epitáfio - Gal Costa
As Dores do Mundo - Hyldon
Incondicionalmente - Vega
Onde Anda Você - Toquinho e Vinicius
Pra Te Amar - Nila Branco

External links
Information on Jamais Te Esquecerei
Opening of the novel Jamais Te Esquecerei

Sistema Brasileiro de Televisão telenovelas
Brazilian telenovelas
2003 Brazilian television series debuts
2003 Brazilian television series endings
2003 telenovelas
Brazilian television series based on Mexican television series
Portuguese-language telenovelas